True's beaked whale (Mesoplodon mirus) is a medium-sized whale in the genus Mesoplodon. It is native to the northern Atlantic Ocean. The common name is in reference to Frederick W. True, a curator at the United States National Museum (now the Smithsonian).

Taxonomy
The species was first described in 1913 by Frederick W. True from an adult female that had stranded on the outer bank of Bird Island Shoal, Beaufort Harbor, North Carolina, in July 1912.

Previously, this species was thought to have two separate populations representing potential subspecies; one in the North Atlantic, and another in the southern Indian Ocean. However, in 2021 the Indian Ocean population (which was found to have a significantly wider range throughout the Southern Hemisphere) was described as a distinct species: Ramari's beaked whale (M. eueu).

Physical description

This whale has a normal mesoplodont body, except that it is rotund in the middle and tapering towards the ends. The two distinctive teeth on the males are small and set on the very end of the beak (however additional teeth have been recorded ). The melon is rather bulbous, and leads into a short beak. There is a crease behind the blowhole, and a sharp dorsal ridge on the back near the dorsal fin. The coloration is gray to brownish gray on the back which is lighter below, and notably darker on the "lips", around the eye, and near the dorsal fin. There is sometimes a dark blaze between the head and dorsal fin as well. One female in the Southern Hemisphere was bluish black with a white area between the dorsal fin and tail as well as a light gray jaw and throat, as well as black speckling. One individual from the Canary Islands had an area of white from snout to blowhole. Scars from fighting and cookiecutter sharks are present on males.

Behavior

They have been seen in small groups, and are believed to be squid eaters. The most complete description of recorded live sightings and strandings, as well as the first underwater footage, was published in a 2017 article by Natacha Aguilar de Soto in the open access journal PeerJ.

Population and distribution
This species lives in the North Atlantic and has stranded from Nova Scotia in the western Atlantic to Ireland in the eastern Atlantic and as far south as Florida, the Bahamas, and Canary Islands. The species does not inhabit the Southern Atlantic and appears to avoid tropical waters.

Conservation
This species has not been hunted and has not been a victim of fishing nets. True's beaked whale is covered by the Agreement on the Conservation of Small Cetaceans of the Baltic, North East Atlantic, Irish and North Seas (ASCOBANS) and the Agreement on the Conservation of Cetaceans in the Black Sea, Mediterranean Sea and Contiguous Atlantic Area (ACCOBAMS). The species is further included in the Memorandum of Understanding Concerning the Conservation of the Manatee and Small Cetaceans of Western Africa and Macaronesia (Western African Aquatic Mammals MoU) and the Memorandum of Understanding for the Conservation of Cetaceans and Their Habitats in the Pacific Islands Region (Pacific Cetaceans MoU).

See also

List of cetaceans

References

Bibliography

Rare species found dead
http://oceanfm.ie/news/2009/03/21/strandhill-whale-one-of-the-worlds-rarest-species/
Dead whale found on Buckroe Beach in Hampton (VA) (Nov. 9, 2009)
Beached whale first of its kind in New Zealand (Feb. 8, 2012)
True’s beaked whale (Mesoplodon mirus) in Macaronesia (Mar. 7, 2017)

External links
Factsheets
Cetaceans of the World
CMS
Whale & Dolphin Conservation Society (WDCS)
True's Beaked Whale - ARKive bio
True's Beaked Whale - The Beaked Whale Resource

Mesoplodont whales
Cetaceans of Europe
Cetaceans of the Atlantic Ocean
Mammals described in 1913
Articles containing video clips